A transnational political party is a single political party with members or representatives in more than one country.

A well-known example is the Arab Baath Socialist Party, established as an Arab nationalist and socialist party aspiring to pan-Arab political union. The party's central governing body, the National Command, included representatives from its organisations in all the Arab countries where Baathists had a significant presence. Each branch of the party, in turn, had a local governing body, the Regional Command, and although practical power became centred in the Syrian and Iraqi Regional Commands and the National Command of each faction assumed an essentially symbolic role, the party split in 1966, with different factions taking control in Syria and Iraq, each faction retained a pan-Arab structure.

Another example of a transnational political party is Sinn Féin, which has 7 Members of Parliament in the United Kingdom Parliament, and 37 Teachtaí Dála in the Irish Dáil Éireann. Sinn Féin also has 26 MLAs in the Northern Ireland Assembly.

Some transnational organisations also have a party-political dimension. The best example of this is the European Union, in which groups of national political parties operate together when participating in EU institutions, especially the European Parliament, as European political parties, or "Europarties". However, Europarties are distinct from transnational political parties in that they do not operate at the national level.

In a broad sense, global movements such as communism, socialism, and Islamism have transnational qualities, but in most such cases the party organization is separate in each country, with the transnational aspect being one more of consultatation and coordination, often through political internationals. One notable exception to this rule is the Progressive Labor Party (United States), which views proletarian internationalism as requiring that they set up party collectives all over the globe. Some Trotskyist parties behave similarly.

List of transnational political parties

Current

European political parties
A European political party is an organisation constituted by multiple national political parties which operates as a single party at the European Union level.
EUDemocrats
European Democratic Party
European Free Alliance
European Green Party
Party of the European Left
European Liberal Democrat and Reform Party
European People's Party
Party of European Socialists
Alliance of Conservatives and Reformists in Europe
Alliance for Europe of the Nations
Alliance des Démocrates Indépendants en Europe

Former
African Democratic Rally
African Party for the Independence of Guinea and Cape Verde
African Unification Union
Arab Baath Socialist Party

See also
Political international

References

 
Transnationalism
Types of political parties